Methylhexane may refer to either of two chemical compounds:

 2-Methylhexane
 3-Methylhexane